Clive Peter Green (born 6 December 1959) is an English former professional footballer who played in the Football League as a forward for Portsmouth. He also played non-league football for clubs including Yeovil Town, Maidstone United, Croydon, Dover Athletic and Salisbury.

References

1959 births
Living people
Footballers from Portsmouth
English footballers
Association football forwards
Portsmouth F.C. players
Yeovil Town F.C. players
Maidstone United F.C. (1897) players
Croydon F.C. players
Dover Athletic F.C. players
Salisbury City F.C. players
English Football League players
Southern Football League players
National League (English football) players